Carrie Ng (born 1963) is a Hong Kong actress well known for both Category-III cult and mainstream films. She won Best Actress at the 1993 Golden Horse Film Festival awards for her performance in Remains of a Woman and Best Supporting Actress at the 2000 Hong Kong Film Awards for The Kid. Other notable film credits include Edward Yang's Mahjong (1996) and cult classics Sex and Zen (1991) and Naked Killer (1992).

Ng made her directorial debut with the revenge-thriller Angel Whispers (2015), which she co-directed, produced and scripted with film executive Shirley Yung.

Selected filmography
City on Fire (1987)
Call Girl'88 (1988)The First Time is the Last Time (1989)Sentenced to Hang (1989)Till We Meet Again (1991)Crystal Hunt (film) (1991)Sex and Zen (1991)Naked Killer (1992)Cheetah on Fire (1992)Justice, My Foot! (1992)Remains of a Woman (1993)C'est la vie, mon chéri (1993)The Lovers (1994)Right Here Waiting (1994)Passion Unbounded (1995)The Eighth (1996)Mahjong (1996)The Kid (2000)Red Nights (2009)Hi, Fidelity (2011)The Silent War (2012)Aberdeen (2014)Hungry Ghost Ritual (2014)Gangster Payday (2014)Angel Whispers (2015) [co-directed with Shirley Yung]
Knock Knock Who's There? (2015) [co-directed and starring in《種貓》]Zombiology: Enjoy Yourself Tonight (2017)Prison Flowers (2019)Undercover Punch and Gun'' (2019)

Awards and nominations

References

External links
Essential Guide to Hong Kong Movies (1994) Personalities Directory p. 314
Lethal Lolita Carrie Ng

1963 births
Living people
20th-century Hong Kong actresses
21st-century Hong Kong actresses
Hong Kong film actresses